The 19th Ryder Cup Matches were held September 16–18, 1971, in the United States at the Old Warson Country Club in St. Louis, Missouri. The U.S. team won the competition by a score of 18 to 13 points.

Format
The Ryder Cup is a match play event, with each match worth one point.  From 1963 through 1971 the competition format was as follows:
Day 1 — 8 foursomes (alternate shot) matches, 4 each in morning and afternoon sessions
Day 2 — 8 four-ball (better ball) matches, 4 each in morning and afternoon sessions
Day 3 — 16 singles matches, 8 each in morning and afternoon sessions
With a total of 32 points, 16 points were required to win the Cup. All matches were played to a maximum of 18 holes.

Teams
Source: 

Six members of the Great Britain team were selected from a points list based on a player's best 10 performances in 15 events during the 1971 season, ending with the Benson & Hedges Festival of Golf on 21 August. The remaining six were chosen by a committee and announced on 23 August. The leading six in the points table were: Neil Coles, Peter Oosterhuis, Brian Barnes, Harry Bannerman, Peter Butler and Maurice Bembridge. The committee chose Brian Huggett, Peter Townsend and Bernard Gallacher who had finished 7th, 8th and 9th in the list, together with Tony Jacklin, Christy O'Connor Snr and John Garner. Jacklin had played most of his golf in America, while O'Connor had missed much of the season with a wrist injury. Garner was chosen over Tommy Horton who had had a good season in 1970 but had been less consistent than Garner in 1971.

Thursday's matches

Morning foursomes

Afternoon foursomes

Friday's matches

Morning four-ball

Afternoon four-ball

Saturday's matches

Morning singles

Afternoon singles

Individual player records
Each entry refers to the win–loss–half record of the player.

Source:

United States

Great Britain

References

External links
PGA of America: 1971 Ryder Cup 
About.com: 1971 Ryder Cup
Old Warson Country Club

Ryder Cup
Golf in Missouri
Ryder Cup
Ryder Cup
Ryder Cup
Ryder Cup